Gunhild Maria Larking (born 13 January 1936) is a retired Swedish high jumper. She competed at the 1952 Summer Olympics, 1954 European Athletics Championships and 1956 Summer Olympics and placed ninth in 1952 and fourth in 1954 and 1956. She won five consecutive national titles from 1952 to 1956.

References

External links
 About 'Gunhild Larking Sweden's Entry for High Jump Nervously Awaiting Turn to Compete at Olympic Games'
 friidrott.se:s Stora Grabbar-sida

1936 births
Swedish female high jumpers
Athletes (track and field) at the 1952 Summer Olympics
Athletes (track and field) at the 1956 Summer Olympics
Olympic athletes of Sweden
Living people
People from Jönköping
Sportspeople from Jönköping County